Schoenobiblus is a genus of flowering plants belonging to the family Thymelaeaceae.

Its native range is Central and Southern Tropical America to Trinidad.

Species:

Schoenobiblus amazonica 
Schoenobiblus cannabina 
Schoenobiblus coriacea 
Schoenobiblus crassisepala 
Schoenobiblus daphnoides 
Schoenobiblus elliptica 
Schoenobiblus grandifolia 
Schoenobiblus panamensis 
Schoenobiblus peruviana 
Schoenobiblus suffruticosa

References

Thymelaeaceae
Malvales genera